The Hachikō Line is a 92.0 km (57.2 mi) regional railway line owned and operated by East Japan Railway Company (JR East). It is located within Tokyo, Saitama, and Gunma Prefectures in Japan. It connects Hachiōji Station in Hachiōji, Tokyo with Kuragano Station in Takasaki, Gunma Prefecture.

Services
Komagawa Station in Hidaka, Saitama is the boundary point between two distinct sections. The southern section from Hachiōji to Komagawa is electrified at 1,500 V DC. Some trains terminate at Komagawa, while others continue over the Kawagoe Line to Kawagoe Station.

The non-electrified northern section connects Komagawa with Kuragano. There are no through services connecting the southern and northern halves of the line.

Stations
 All trains stop at every station.
 Stations marked "o" or "^" allow passing; stations marked"|" do not. Stations marked "∥" are double-tracked.

Hachiōji - Komagawa

Komagawa - Takasaki

Rolling stock
209-3500 series 4-car EMUs x 5 (Kawagoe Line/Hachiko Line services since 7 May 2018)
E231-3000 series 4-car EMUs x 6 (Kawagoe Line/Hachiko Line services since 19 February 2018)
KiHa 110 series DMUs (formed as 1- to 3-car trains for services north of Komagawa) (since 18 March 1993)

From 2017, former E231-0 series ten-car sets based at Mitaka Depot for use on Chūō–Sōbu Line services were reformed and converted to become four-car E231-3000 series sets based at Kawagoe for use on Kawagoe Line and Hachiko Line services. The first set entered revenue service on the line on 19 February 2018.

From 2018, former 209-500 series ten-car sets based at Mitaka Depot for use on Chūō–Sōbu Line services were reformed and converted to become four-car 209-3500 series sets based at Kawagoe for use on Kawagoe Line and Hachiko Line services.

Rolling stock previously used
KiHa 35 DMUs (until 15 March 1996)
103-3000 series EMUs (from March 1985 until October 2005)
103-3500 series EMU (from March 1996 until March 2005)
201 series EMUs (Chūō Line (Rapid) through services between Komagawa and Haijima, until March 2008)
205-3000 series 4-car EMUs x 5 (Kawagoe Line/Hachiko Line services since 11 November 2003 until July 2018)
209-3000 series 4-car EMUs x 4 (Kawagoe Line/Hachiko Line services from 16 March 1996 until February 2019)
209-3100 series 4-car EMUs x 2 (Kawagoe Line/Hachiko Line services since 17 April 2005 until 2022)
E233 series EMUs (Chūō Line (Rapid) through services between Komagawa and Haijima, from 17 March 2007 until 11 March 2022)

History
The first section of the line, named the Hachikō North Line (Hepburn: Hachikō-kita-sen), opened from Kuragano to Kodama on 1 July 1931, followed by the section from Hachioji to Higashi-Hanno, named the Hachikō South Line (Hepburn: Hachikō-minami-sen), on 10 December 1931. The Hachiko North Line was extended southward from Kodama to Yorii on 25 January 1933, and the Hachiko South Line was extended northward from Higashi-Hanno to Ogose on 15 April 1933. The Hachiko South Line was further extended northward from Ogose to Ogawamachi on 24 March 1934, and the last section between Ogawamachi and Yorii opened on 6 October 1934, connecting the north and south sections, and completing the entire line, which became known simply as the Hachiko Line.

All passenger operations were switch from steam haulage to electric trains from 20 November 1958.

CTC signalling was commissioned over the entire line from 27 February 1985. On 1 April 1987, with the privatization and splitting of Japanese National Railways (JNR), the Hachiko Line was transferred to the ownership of JR East.

Also from the same date until 11 March 2022, some morning rush hour services left the Hachikō Line at Haijima Station and travel to Tokyo via the Ōme Line and Chūō Line; the reverse happened during the evening rush.

Starting 12 March 2022, the southern section from Hachiōji to Komagawa (and through services to the Kawagoe Line) began one-man driver only operation services using the existing 209-3500 and E231-3000 series EMUs.

Former connecting lines
 Komagawa station – A freight-only line serving the Nippon Cement works in Hidaka operated from 1963 until 1984, which also connected to Nishi-Oya on the Tobu Ogose Line.

Accidents
In 1945, a head-on collision at the Tamagawa bridge resulted in 105 fatalities.

The Hachiko Line derailment in 1947 is Japan's worst rail accident since World War II in terms of fatalities.

References

 
Lines of East Japan Railway Company
Railway lines in Tokyo
Rail transport in Saitama Prefecture
Rail transport in Gunma Prefecture
1067 mm gauge railways in Japan
Railway lines opened in 1931
1931 establishments in Japan